Pericallis malvifolia is a species of flowering plant in the daisy family Asteraceae endemic to the Azores. It is found in coastal cliffs, ravines and interior of craters. In Santa Maria also on the side of roads and woods of Pittosporum undulatum. It appears from sea level to about  altitude. It is present in Santa Maria, São Miguel, São Jorge, Pico and Faial.

References

malvifolia
Endemic flora of the Azores